{{DISPLAYTITLE:C15H10O5}}
The chemical formula C15H10O5 (molar mass : 270.23 g/mol, exact mass : 270.052823) may refer to: 
 Trihydroxyflavones:
 Apigenin (5,7,4'-trihydroxyflavone) 
 Baicalein (5,6,7-trihydroxyflavone)
 Galangin (3,5,7-trihydroxyflavone)
 Norwogonin (5,7,8-Trihydroxyflavone)
 7,8,3'-Trihydroxyflavone
 6,7,4'-Trihydroxyflavone
 Aloe emodin, an anthraquinone
 Emodin, a purgative resin
 Genistein, an isoflavone
 Morindone, an anthraquinone dye
 Thunberginol A, an isocoumarin
 Thunberginol F, a natural benzofuran

See also 
 List of compounds with carbon number 15